Gailey is a surname. Notable people with the name include:

Chan Gailey (born 1952), American football player and coach
David Gailey (1807–1881), Australian pioneer
Doug Gailey (died 2007), New Zealand rugby league player
Francis Gailey (1882–1972), Australian-born American competition swimmer
Jeannine Hall Gailey (born 1973), American poet
Mike Gailey (born 1970), American soccer player
Richard Gailey (1834–1924), Irish-born Australian architect
Robert Gailey (1869–1950), American football player and coach
Sarah Gailey, American author

See also 
 Gailey (disambiguation)